Highway 355 is a north–south highway in southwest Arkansas. The southern terminus of its longest section is at an intersection with U.S. Route 67 in Fulton. Communities along this  route include Fulton, McNab, Saratoga, Tollette, and Mineral Springs.

Major intersections

References

355
Transportation in Columbia County, Arkansas
Transportation in Nevada County, Arkansas
Transportation in Hempstead County, Arkansas
Transportation in Howard County, Arkansas